Adinazolam (marketed under the brand name Deracyn) is a tranquilizer of the triazolobenzodiazepine (TBZD) class, which are benzodiazepines (BZDs) fused with a triazole ring. It possesses anxiolytic, anticonvulsant, sedative, and antidepressant properties. Adinazolam was developed by Jackson B. Hester, who was seeking to enhance the antidepressant properties of alprazolam, which he also developed. Adinazolam was never FDA approved and never made available to the public market, however it has been sold as a designer drug.

Side effects
Overdose may include muscle weakness, ataxia, dysarthria and particularly in children paradoxical excitement, as well as diminished reflexes, confusion and coma may ensue in more severe cases.

A human study comparing the subjective effects and abuse potential of adinazolam (30 mg and 50 mg) with diazepam, lorazepam and a placebo showed that adinazolam causes the most "mental and physical sedation" and the greatest "mental unpleasantness".

Pharmacodynamics and pharmacokinetics
Adinazolam binds to peripheral-type benzodiazepine receptors that interact allosterically with GABA receptors as an agonist to produce inhibitory effects.

Metabolism
Adinazolam was reported to have active metabolites in the August 1984 issue of The Journal of Pharmacy and Pharmacology. The main metabolite is N-desmethyladinazolam. NDMAD has an approximately 25-fold high affinity for benzodiazepine receptors as compared to its precursor, accounting for the benzodiazepine-like effects after oral administration. Multiple N-dealkylations lead to the removal of the dimethylaminomethyl side chain, leading to the difference in its potency. The other two metabolites are alpha-hydroxyalprazolam and estazolam. In the August 1986 issue of that same journal, Sethy, Francis and Day reported that proadifen inhibited the formation of N-desmethyladinazolam.

See also
 Benzodiazepine
 Alprazolam
 Fluadinazolam
 GL-II-73

References

Triazolobenzodiazepines
Chloroarenes
Designer drugs
GABAA receptor positive allosteric modulators
Hypnotics